James Emott Caldwell (1813–81) was an American jeweler who founded J.E. Caldwell & Co. in 1839.  While best known as a major fine jewelry institution of Philadelphia, over the years since its inception, the firm has also been known for its silver, china, crystal, and even stationery.

Early life 
Born August 15, 1813, in Poughkeepsie, NY, James Emott Caldwell was raised in "The Queen City of the Hudson". In his school days he was a classmate of Theodore Cuyler, Benson J. Lossing, Jackson S. Schultz, the Vassar brothers, who afterwards won distinction, and who remained his personal friends through life. At the age of 14 in 1827, he started to learn the art of silver making under the supervision of his Master Peter Perret Hayes. Mr. Caldwell was the youngest apprentice in the establishment at that time, while the oldest was Joseph T. Bailey of Bailey Banks & Biddle, between whom there sprang up an intimacy that ripened into warm friendship. In 1835 after becoming a master  silversmith, he moved to New York City as an apprentice in watch-making with  Samuel Ward Benedict  in his downtown Wall Street shop.

Personal life 
Caldwell married Sarah Caroline Butler on 1 September 1842 in Philadelphia, Pennsylvania. They had six children: three sons, James Albert Caldwell born on 9 November 1844, Richard Nelson Caldwell born on 24 February 1854, Clarence Edmund Caldwell born on 18 October 1857 and three daughters: Laura Emott Caldwell(Bulkley), Caroline Elizabeth Caldwell(Brewster), and Bellinda Caldwell(Claxton). James Emott Caldwell died on Saturday 24 September 1881, at his residence in Germantown.

Career 
In 1836 he moved to Philadelphia and landed his first job, to work with Samuel Hildeburn a wholesale jewelry house of Market Street. A short time after he was hired by John Farr to work as a watch maker for the watch importer and jewelry manufacturer John C. Farr & Co at No. 112 Chestnut Street. He opened his first retail store in 1839 at No. 136 Chestnut Street. During that time in 1841, Caldwell partnered with   James M. Bennett and founded "Bennett & Caldwell" at No. 140 Chestnut Street across the street from his store where he remained until 1858. Upon Bennett's death, John C. Farr, one of his first employers, became associated with Caldwell, and the firm became J.E. Caldwell & Co.

References 

 “Watches and Jewellery,” United States Gazette, June 30, 1839, in Marguerite Aspinwall, The Hallington, 1964.
Thomas J. Brady, “J.E. Caldwell leaving its Center City setting: Among the Last of Chestnut Street’s Old Jewels,” Philadelphia Inquirer, 3/27/2003, http://articles.philly.com/2003-03-27/business/25472037_1_jewelry-stores-banks-biddle-sale
"DEATH OF J. E. CALDWELL, JEWELER" Philadelphia Inquirer 1881, https://www.findagrave.com/memorial/80561145
"American Silversmith",http://freepages.genealogy.rootsweb.ancestry.com/~silversmiths/makers/silversmiths/201971.htm
"Bought of J. E. Caldwell & Co. Jewelers. No. 902 Chestnut St", librarycompany.org
"James E. Caldwell & Co., jewelers, no. 902 Chestnut Street, Photo,librarycompany.org
"Portrait of James E. Caldwell", "Moses King's Philadelphia and Notable Philadelphians", Issue 1902,Page 109, librarycompany.org
vol. 10 of a series of scrapbooks compiled by local historian Charles A. Poulson, librarycompany.org
"J.E. Caldwell & Co.", Dictionnaire International du Bijou, Page 104, REGARD Publishing, 1998.

External links
"Washington Hose Company of Philadelphia [certificate]",librarycompany.org
 "[Plate 7 and advertisements from Rae's Philadelphia pictorial directory & panoramic advertiser. Chestnut Street, from Fourth to Fifth Streets] [graphic]",librarycompany.org
"[Chestnut Street above Eighth Street, south side, looking west] [graphic]",librarycompany.org

1813 births
1881 deaths
American jewellers
Businesspeople from Poughkeepsie, New York
19th-century American businesspeople